The Mitton Hoard is a hoard of silver coins found near Clitheroe in  Lancashire, England, in 2006 or 2009. The hoard is now in Clitheroe Castle Museum. The documented treasure consisted of 11 silver coins or parts of coins.

Local history
Mitton is divided into two villages, Great Mitton and Little Mitton. This find was first detected to the west of Great Mitton between the River Hodder and the River Ribble. The find was near a bend in the River Hodder. One source says that these coins were found in 2006 whilst another says that the coins were found using a metal detector on Monday 7 September 2009. The treasure was declared to be treasure and it was obtained by the museum services. The hoard is now on display in the Clitheroe Castle Museum.

The hoard

The hoard can be dated from the date of the last coin that was included in the hoard and this came from the 1420s. Three of the coins were the oldest and they dated to the reign of Edward I or Edward II. The English silver is 97.5% pure whilst the French fragments are 80% pure silver. With the exception of the farthing these coins represent all the small value coins. It is thought that these coins could all be in circulation at the same time. The hoard was probably either accidentally lost, or deliberately hidden, in the late 1420s.

Artefacts
The documented treasure consisted of 11 silver coins or coin fragments. The coins were:
Three pennies from Edward I or Edward II of England
Two half-groats from Edward III of England
A halfpenny from Richard II of England
Three groats from Henry VI of England
There are also two small fragments made for Gaucher V de Châtillon between 1313 and 1322. Gaucher V de Châtillon held one of five highest officers of state as he was the Constable of France from 1302 to 1329.
Note: Eleven of the coins are documented however there are more than eleven coins on display at the Clitheroe Castle Museum.

See also

 List of hoards in Britain
 History of the English penny (1154–1485)

References 

Clitheroe
Treasure troves in England
Treasure troves of Medieval Europe
2009 archaeological discoveries
Collections of Lancashire Museums
History of Lancashire